Andrew John Casson FRS (born 1943) is a mathematician, studying geometric topology. Casson is the Philip Schuyler Beebe Professor of Mathematics at Yale University.

Education and Career
Casson was educated at Latymer Upper School and Trinity College, Cambridge, where he graduated with a BA in the Mathematical Tripos in 1965. His doctoral advisor at the University of Liverpool was C. T. C. Wall, but he never completed his doctorate; instead what would have been his Ph.D. thesis became his fellowship dissertation as a research fellow at Trinity College.

Casson was Professor of Mathematics at the University of Texas at Austin between 1981 and 1986, at the University of California, Berkeley, from 1986 to 2000, and has been at Yale since 2000.

Work
Casson has worked in both high-dimensional manifold topology and 3- and 4-dimensional topology,
using both geometric and algebraic techniques. Among other discoveries, he contributed 
to the disproof of the manifold Hauptvermutung, introduced the Casson invariant, a modern invariant for 3-manifolds, and Casson handles, used in Michael Freedman's proof of the 4-dimensional Poincaré conjecture.

Awards
In 1991, he was awarded the Oswald Veblen Prize in Geometry by the American Mathematical Society. In 1998, he was elected to Fellowship of the Royal Society.

References

External links
 Official Home Page
 The Hauptvermutung book (including Casson's 1967 Trinity College fellowship dissertation)
 Proceedings of the Casson Fest (Arkansas and Texas 2003) A conference to celebrate Casson's 60th birthday, with biographical information.
 Photos from conference, including the `honorary degree' presented to Casson by the participants

1943 births
Living people
Fellows of the Royal Society
Alumni of Trinity College, Cambridge
University of Texas at Austin faculty
University of California, Berkeley College of Letters and Science faculty
Yale University faculty
Topologists